The Skate-class submarines were the United States Navy's first production run of nuclear-powered submarines. The four Skate class boats re-introduced stern torpedo tubes. Although among the smallest nuclear-powered attack submarines ever built, the Skate class served for many years, with the last being decommissioned in 1989. USS Skate was the first submarine to surface at the North Pole, on 17 March 1959.

Skate and Sargo were built with the S3W reactor, Swordfish and Seadragon also had the S3W reactor in the S4W reactor plant (same machinery in an alternate arrangement).

Design

The Skate class were designed under project SCB 121 as economical production nuclear-powered submarines (SSNs), and thus were smaller and more austere than their ground-breaking predecessor , whose high cost had raised concerns. They were designed before Nautilus demonstrated the advantages of sustained high underwater speed, thus their designed speed was about the maximum speed of the conventional Tang class, which had a similar displacement to the Skates. Their S3W reactor was a scaled-down version of Nautilus S2W reactor with about half the power output; it was known as SFR (Submarine Fleet Reactor) during development. A slightly modified version known as S4W powered the second pair of Skate-class boats. Unfortunately, scaling down the reactor did not reduce the weight of reactor shielding proportionally, and it was eventually realized that further downsizing was impractical. In the late 1950s it was hoped that the nuclear-powered aircraft program would develop reactors suitable for very small SSNs, but the program was unsuccessful. Their armament was the same as the Tangs, six bow and two stern 21 inch (533 mm) torpedo tubes. Like the Tangs, the stern tubes had no ejection pump, and could only be used for swim-out weapons such as the Mark 37 ASW homing torpedo. The quest for a high submerged speed and improved sonar led to the subsequent  and es becoming the model for further development.

Service

Skate was notable as the first submarine to surface at the North Pole, on 17 March 1959. A previous attempt in 1958 had resulted in no suitable place found for surfacing near the Pole. Sargo and Seadragon also conducted significant polar operations in their careers. After 25–30 years each of successful service, mostly out of Pearl Harbor, the class was retired in the 1980s and disposed of through the Navy's nuclear Ship-Submarine Recycling Program.

Ships in class

References

Miller, David. The Illustrated Directory of Submarines of the World, p. 366. .

External links

 SSN Photo Gallery index at NavSource.org

Submarine classes
 
 Skate class
 Skate class